Major facilitator superfamily domain containing 14A (MFSD14A, HIAT1) is a protein that in humans is encoded by the MFSD14A gene. MFSD14A is an atypical solute carrier of MFS type. HGNC:23363

MFSD14A cluster to AMTF1, together with MFSD9, MFSD10 and MFSD14B.

References